General Jordan may refer to:

Amos Jordan (1922–2018), U.S. Army brigadier general
Hans Jordan (1892–1975), German Army general
Ricardo López Jordán (1822–1889), Argentine general
Thomas Jordan (general) (1819–1895), Confederate States Army brigadier general and Cuban Liberation Army general

See also
Tadeusz Jordan-Rozwadowski (1866–1928), Polish Army chief of general staff
Jean-Baptiste Jourdan (1762–1833), French Army general